Orange Blossoms is the fourth studio album from the band JJ Grey & Mofro. The album was recorded in north Florida, and features 12 songs (including 11 Grey originals) inspired by Grey's experiences and observations. The sole cover is a rendition of "Everything Good Is Bad", originally by Detroit act 100 Proof (Aged In Soul) on Hot Wax Records. Accompanying  are guitarist Daryl Hance, bassist/organist Adam Scone, drummer Anthony Cole, saxophonist Art Edmaiston and trumpeter Dennis Marion.

Track listing

Personnel
JJ Grey - lead vocal, lead and rhythm guitar, sitar, pianos, clavinet, talkbox, harmonica, percussion and bass on tracks 7 and 8
Daryl Hance - slide and rhythm guitar
Adam Scone - bass and Hammond B3 organ
Anthony Cole - drums
Art Edmaiston - tenor saxophone
Dennis Marion - trumpet
Clay Watson - trombone

References

2008 albums
Alligator Records albums
JJ Grey & Mofro albums